BB2 may refer to:

Baahubali 2: The Conclusion, an Indian film directed by S. S. Rajamouli
Bhool Bhulaiyaa 2, a 2022 Indian Hindi language film directed by Anees Bazmee
USS Massachusetts (BB-2), a United States battleship from 1896 to 1919
Bad Boys II, a 2003 action comedy movie starring Martin Lawrence and Will Smith
Gastrin-releasing peptide receptor (GRPR), also known as BB2
Big Brother 2, a television programme in various versions
BB2, a postcode district in the BB postcode area